Ecyrus penicillatus is a species of beetle in the family Cerambycidae. It was described by Henry Walter Bates in 1880. It is known from Guatemala, Honduras, the United States and Mexico.

References

Pogonocherini
Beetles described in 1880